T.I. Ahmadiyya Girls' Senior High School (Amass Girls) is a girls' second-cycle institution in Asokore in the Sekyere East District of Ashanti Region, Ghana.

History
The school was established by the Ahmadiyya Muslim Mission, Ghana, in 1968 as a middle school. The following year, the school was converted into a secondary school.

List of headmasters

In 1973, the school was registered by the Ghana Education Service.

See also

 Education in Ghana
 List of senior high schools in the Ashanti Region

References

External links
 , the school's official website

1968 establishments in Ghana
Ahmadiyya educational institutions
Ashanti Region
Educational institutions established in 1968
Girls' schools in Ghana
High schools in Ghana
Islam in Ghana
Islamic secondary schools in Africa
Religious schools in Ghana